Wilmot House, also known as David Wilmot House, is a historic home located at Bethany, Wayne County, Pennsylvania.  It was built about 1811, and is a -story, wood-frame dwelling in the style of a New England farmhouse.  It is three bays wide and two bays deep and has a medium pitch gable roof.  It has a -story addition with a saltbox roof.  Congressman, Senator, and abolition advocate David Wilmot (1814-1868) was born in the house in 1814.

It was added to the National Register of Historic Places in 1974.

References

External links

Houses on the National Register of Historic Places in Pennsylvania
Historic American Buildings Survey in Pennsylvania
Houses completed in 1811
Houses in Wayne County, Pennsylvania
National Register of Historic Places in Wayne County, Pennsylvania